Simon Rose may refer to:

 Simon Rose (author) (born 1961), Canadian author of science fiction and fantasy novels for children and young adults
 Simon Rose (journalist) (born 1957), former BBC Radio researcher
 Simon Rose (cricketer) (born 1989), English cricketer